Michalów  is a village in the administrative district of Gmina Sułów, within Zamość County, Lublin Voivodeship, in eastern Poland.

The village has a population of 1,100.

References

www.michalow1.za.pl

Villages in Zamość County